Hierodoris sesioides is a species of moth in the family Oecophoridae. It is endemic to New Zealand and is known from its type locality of Esk State Forest in the Hawkes Bay. The host species is Spohora tetraptera, a kōwhai species. The larvae feed internally in woody galls on the stems of this plant. This species is classified as "Data Deficient" by the Department of Conservation.

Taxonomy and etymology 
This species was first described by Robert R. J. Hoare in 2005. The male holotype was reared from larvae collected in Esk State Forest on the 4 March 1964 by H. Auld. Prior to its formal description, this species as known as Hierodoris 'clear wing'. The holotype specimen is held at the New Zealand Arthropod Collection. The epithet comes from Sesia, a genus of clearwing moths, and the Greek word 'eides' meaning likeness. It refers to the resemblance of this species to a sesiid.

Description
H. sesioides has a very narrow forewing and a semi-transparent white hindwing, with a well-defined black border.

Distribution 
This species is endemic to New Zealand. It is only known from the type locality in Hawkes Bay.

Biology and behaviour 
Little is known of the biology of this species.

Host species and habitat 
The host species for the larvae of this moth is the kowhai tree, Sophora tetraptera. The larvae feed internally in woody galls on stems of their host tree.

Conservation Status 
This species has been classified as having the "Data Deficient" conservation status under the New Zealand Threat Classification System.

References

Moths described in 2005
Moths of New Zealand
Xyloryctinae
Endemic fauna of New Zealand
Endangered biota of New Zealand
Endemic moths of New Zealand